The Gajaba Regiment (GR) is an elite infantry regiment of the Sri Lankan Army. Formed on 14 October 1983 at the Saliyapura Camp in Anuradhapura, it is named after the famous Sinhalese  King Gajabahu the First. It consists of 14 regular battalions and 6 volunteer battalions.

History
The 1st battalion, Gajaba Regiment was formed on 14 October 1983 with the amalgamation of officers and men of the 1st Rajarata Rifles and the 1st Vijayabahu Infantry Regiment, under the command of Lieutenant Colonel Vijaya Wimalaratne at Saliyapura Camp with a strength of 36 officers and 752 other ranks. The 2/3 (Volunteer) Rajarata Rifles was reconstituted as the 2nd (Volunteer) battalion, Gajaba Battalion at Fort Fredrick in Trincomalee on the 14 October 1983 under the command of the Lieutenant Colonel W.R. Wijerathna. The Cap badge of the Gajaba Regiment was designed with a shield, two Keteri (battle axes) and a Kandian powder flask. The newly formed regular infantry battalion was deployed for internal security duties in the Jaffna peninsula from 1983 to 1984 and again in 1985, where it sustained casualties in counter insurgency operations. With the escalation of the Sri Lankan Civil War and Sri Lanka Army expanded and to cope with the demand of operational needs multi battalion structure was introduced. A second regular infantry battalion was formed as the 3rd battalion in January 1986. Both regular battalions took part in the Vadamarachchi Operation in May 1987. With the start of the 1987–1989 JVP insurrection both regular and volunteer units of the regiment were deployed in the southern part of the island for counter insurgency operations. The regiment took part in all major offensives of the civil war and was involved in many major battles were the Gajaba units involved suffered over 80% casualty rates such as the 3rd battalion (149 killed and 115 missing) in the Battle of Pooneryn and the 8th battalion in the Second Battle of Elephant Pass. By the end of the Sri Lankan Civil War, the regiment had 27 battalions and had lost 3,500 officers and men who had been killed in action.  

The regiment was awarded President's colours by President Mahinda Rajapakse on 11 January 2007. In 2008 a detachment from the regiment was sent to take part in the United Nations Stabilization Mission in Haiti.

Sports 
 Gajaba Supercross
Since 1999, the Gajaba Regiment organizes the annual Gajaba Supercross in association with the Sri Lanka Association of Racing Drivers and Riders.

 Gajaba Cricket 
In 2021 the regiment built the Gotabaya Rajapaksa Cricket Stadium commissioned Thisara Perera as an officer.

Units

Regular Army
1st Gajaba Battalion
3rd Gajaba Battalion
6th Gajaba Battalion (formed on 17 May 1990 at Vavunia)
8th Gajaba Battalion
9th Gajaba Battalion
10th Gajaba Battalion
12th Gajaba Battalion
14th Gajaba Battalion
16th Gajaba Battalion
20th Gajaba Battalion
21st Gajaba Battalion
22nd Gajaba Battalion
23rd Gajaba Battalion
24th Gajaba Battalion
Gajaba HQ Battalion

Volunteers
2nd(v) Gajaba Battalion (Formed on 14 October 1983)
5th(v) Gajaba Battalion (Formed on 7 July 1989)
7th(v) Gajaba Battalion (Formed on 14 December 1990)
11th(v) Gajaba Battalion (Formed on 21 April 1994)
15th(v) Gajaba Battalion (Formed on 23 June 1997)
17th(v) Gajaba Battalion (Formed on 1 December 2001)
18th(v) Gajaba Battalion (Formed on 30 March 2008 and disbanded on 04 September 2018)
19th(v) Gajaba Battalion (Formed on 25 September 2008 and disbanded on 25 August 2018)
21st(v) Gajaba Battalion (Formed on 25 March 2009 and disbanded on 07 April 2012)
25th(v) Gajaba Battalion (Formed on 10 November 2009 and disbanded on 29 February 2012)

Recipient of the Parama Weera Vibhushanaya
Lieutenant K. W. T. Nissanka 
Warrant Officer II H.B. Pasan Gunasekera 
Captain P. N. Punsiri 
Major W.M.I.S.B. Walisundara

Notable members
Major General Vijaya Wimalaratne, RWP, RSP, VSP, USP - Founder of the Gajaba Regiment.Commander Security Forces Headquarters Jaffna (SF HQ (J)).
Lieutenant Colonel Gotabhaya Rajapaksa, RWP, RSP - former President of Sri Lanka
General Kamal Gunaratne, WWV, RWP, RSP, USP, ndc, psc - Permanent Secretary to the Ministry of Defense and GOC 53rd division in Eelam war IV
General Shavendra Silva, WWV, RWP, RSP, VSV, USP, ndc, psc - Commander of the Sri Lankan Army and GOC 58th division in Eelam war IV 
Major General Sumedha Perera, WWV, RWP, RSP, USP, ndc - Permanent Secretary to the Ministry of Mahaweli, Agriculture, Irrigation & Rural Development
Major General Jagath Dias, WWV, RWP, RSP, USP, ndc - Adjutant General of Sri Lanka Army and GOC 57th division in Eelam war IV
Major General Seevali Wanigasekara RWP, RSP VSV, USP, psc
Major Shantha Wijesinghe  - commanded the defense of Kokkilai and gained the first Battlefield promotion in the army
Warrant Officer I Dinesh Priyantha - Sri Lankan paralympic track and field athlete
Sergeant Maheesh Theekshana - Sri Lanka National Cricketer 
Corporal Ranjith Premasiri Madalana  - Sri Lankan army sniper

Order of precedence

See also
 Sri Lanka Army

References

External links and sources
 Sri Lanka Army
 Gajaba Regiment

Infantry regiments of the Sri Lankan Army
Military units and formations established in 1983